The 2014–15 season is the 68th season in Osijek’s history and their twenty-fourth in the Prva HNL.

First-team squad

Competitions

Overall

Prva HNL

Classification

Results summary

Results by round

Matches

Legend

Prva HNL

Croatian Football Cup

Player seasonal records
Competitive matches only. Updated to games played 30 May 2015.

Top scorers

Source: Competitive matches

Transfers

In

Out

Loans in

Loans out

Sources: nogometni-magazin.com

References 

2014-15
Croatian football clubs 2014–15 season